Arthur Montague Frank Palmer  (4 August 1912 – 14 August 1994) was a British Labour Co-operative politician.

Early life
Palmer was born in Northam, Devon and educated at Ashford County Grammar School and Acton Technical College. He became a chartered electrical engineer and joined the head office staff of the Electrical Power Engineers' Association, editing the Electrical Power Engineer magazine. During World War II and the London Blitz he was an engineer at Battersea Power Station. He served as a councillor on Brentford and Chiswick Borough Council from 1937 to 1945 and later as a conservator of Wimbledon and Putney Commons.

Parliamentary career
Palmer was elected Member of Parliament for Wimbledon in 1945, becoming the first Labour MP for the constituency. He lost in Merton and Morden in 1950 and 1951, but re-entered Parliament, representing Cleveland from a 1952 by-election to 1959, Bristol Central from 1964–February 1974, and Bristol North East from February 1974 to 1983.

Palmer was Chairman of the Parliamentary and Scientific Committee from 1965 to 1968, and Chairman of the House of Commons Select Committee on Science and Technology from 1966 to 1970 and 1974 to 1979.

Personal life and death
In 1939, Palmer married Marion Woollaston, with whom he had two daughters, Professor Sarah Palmer (born 1943) and Julia King (born 1945). Sarah unsuccessfully attempted to be Labour's candidate for Hampstead and Highgate in 1990.

He died on 14 August 1994, aged 82.

References

Times Guide to the House of Commons, 1951, 1966 & 1979

External links
 

1912 births
1994 deaths
Labour Co-operative MPs for English constituencies
Councillors in Greater London
UK MPs 1945–1950
UK MPs 1951–1955
UK MPs 1955–1959
UK MPs 1964–1966
UK MPs 1966–1970
UK MPs 1970–1974
UK MPs 1974
UK MPs 1974–1979
UK MPs 1979–1983
Alumni of Brunel University London
People educated at Ashford County Grammar School